Robert Van Talkington (August 23, 1929–December 26, 2010) was an American politician who served as a Republican in the Kansas State Senate and Kansas House of Representatives from 1969 to 1988.

Talkington was born in Texas, and attended Tyler Junior College before transferring to the University of Kansas on a football and baseball scholarship; he graduated with a bachelor's degree in education in 1951. After gaining his B.A., he entered the University of Kansas School of Law, graduating there in 1954.

Talkington served in the U.S. Army counterintelligence corps during the Korean War. He worked as a lawyer in Iola, Kansas; he was in private practice and also served as the county attorney for Allen County, Kansas as well as city attorney for several nearby towns.

In 1968, Talkington won election to the Kansas House. He served there for two terms, and in 1972 successfully ran for the Kansas Senate. In the Senate, he served four full terms, and was elected President of the Senate for his final term. After his time in the Senate, Talkington was a member of the Kansas Board of Regents from 1996 to 1999. He died of complications from a stroke.

References

Republican Party Kansas state senators
Republican Party members of the Kansas House of Representatives
Presidents of the Kansas Senate
Kansas Republicans
20th-century American politicians
People from Iola, Kansas
University of Kansas alumni
University of Kansas School of Law alumni
United States Army personnel of the Korean War
Kansas city attorneys
District attorneys in Kansas
Kansas Board of Regents
1929 births
2010 deaths